Damien Perrier (born 6 July 1989) is a French professional golfer.

Perrier turned professional in late 2007. He played on mini-tours, including the Alps Tour and the EPD Tour, winning once on each tour. He has also played on the Challenge Tour, with varying status, since 2010. He earned a 2016 Challenge Tour card by finishing third on the 2015 Alps Tour Order of Merit.

Perrier won his first Challenge Tour event in May 2016 at the D+D Real Czech Challenge.

Amateur wins
this list is incomplete
2007 British Boys Amateur

Professional wins (4)

Challenge Tour wins (1)

Alps Tour wins (1)

EPD Tour wins (1)

French Tour wins (1)

Team appearances
Amateur
European Boys' Team Championship (representing France): 2007

See also
2016 Challenge Tour graduates

References

External links

French male golfers
European Tour golfers
Sportspeople from Rennes
1989 births
Living people
21st-century French people